Bötzingen is a municipality in the Breisgau-Hochschwarzwald district, Baden-Württemberg, Germany.

This is a pleasant village, closely situated near the 'green' city of Freiburg. Well served with local schools and other amenities, such as sports grounds and venues. There is an especially good swimming pool.

There are good road and rail links to the city and many residents of Botzingen commute and work in Freiburg. Many residents work in the nearby SMP factory.

Bötzingen is known for its wide variety of local wines.

There is a friendly supermarket and nearby a store dedicated to wine, beer and other beverages.

Behind the village are pleasant, rolling hills, farmed with a mix of vineyards and sweet corn.  Worth a relaxing stroll.

References

Breisgau-Hochschwarzwald
Baden